The men's triple jump event at the 1932 Olympic Games took place August 4. Sixteen athletes from 12 nations competed. The 1930 Olympic Congress in Berlin had reduced the limit from 4 athletes per NOC to 3 athletes. Chuhei Nanbu of Japan won gold with a world record breaking jump. It was Japan's second consecutive gold medal in the men's triple jump; Japan also became the third nation (after the United States and Sweden) to have two medalists in the event in the same Games as Kenkichi Oshima took bronze. Sweden took its first medal in the event since 1920 with Eric Svensson's silver.

Background

This was the ninth appearance of the event, which is one of 12 athletics events to have been held at every Summer Olympics. Returning finalists from the 1928 Games were the two Japanese jumpers, gold medalist Mikio Oda and fourth-place finisher Chuhei Nanbu; they were joined this time by Kenkichi Oshima. Oda held the world record, but was injured. Nanbu was the long jump world record holder and had won bronze in that event earlier in the Games.

India, Italy, and Mexico each made their first appearance in the event. The United States competed for the ninth time, having competed at each of the Games so far.

Competition format

The competition was only a final.

Records

These were the standing world and Olympic records (in metres) prior to the 1928 Summer Olympics.

Chuhei Nambu set the new world and Olympic records with 15.72 metres in his fifth jump.

Schedule

Results

References

Men's triple jump
Triple jump at the Olympics
Men's events at the 1932 Summer Olympics